The Amityville Horror is a 2005 American supernatural horror film directed by Andrew Douglas and starring Ryan Reynolds, Melissa George, and Philip Baker Hall. It also featured the debut of actress Chloe Grace Moretz. Written by Scott Kosar, it is based on the novel The Amityville Horror by Jay Anson, which was previously adapted into the 1979 film of the same name, while also serving as the ninth film in the Amityville Horror film series, which documents the experiences of the Lutz family after they move into a house at 112 Ocean Avenue, Long Island. In 1974, real-life mass murderer Ronald DeFeo Jr. killed six members of his family at the same house in Amityville, New York.

The film was released in the United States on April 15, 2005, by Metro-Goldwyn-Mayer Pictures and Dimension Films. It received negative reviews, with many calling it derivative to the original film but saying it didn't deliver anything new. It grossed $108 million on a $19 million budget.

Plot 
At 3:15 AM on November 13, 1974, Ronald DeFeo Jr. murdered his entire family at their house at 112 Ocean Avenue in Amityville, New York. He claimed that he was persuaded to kill them by voices he heard in the house.

One year later, a married couple George and Kathy Lutz move into the house along with Kathy's three children from a previous marriage, Billy, Michael, and Chelsea. The family soon begins experiencing paranormal events in the house. Chelsea claims that she has befriended a girl named Jodie, a name belonging to one of the murdered DeFeo children.

One night the couple decide to go out, and they hire a babysitter to watch the three kids. When the babysitter, Lisa, arrives, they come to find out that she had previously been hired to babysit for the DeFeo's. Lisa tells them about the murders that took place in their house. When she goes to Chelsea's room, Chelsea tells her that she is a bad babysitter, claiming that Jodie told her so. Lisa begins to scold Jodie for being the reason behind her getting fired. Then Billy dares Lisa to go inside the closet (the same closet where Jodie was murdered), and she gets locked inside. After a few seconds, she encounters Jodie herself and begs to be let out. She goes into shock and the paramedics arrive to take her away; on the way to the hospital, Lisa tells Kathy that she had seen Jodie.

George's behaviour towards Kathy and her children becomes abusive and the paranormal activity continues. One night, George hears Harry barking in the boathouse. Seemingly possessed, he grabs the axe and proceeds to murder the family dog after mistaking it for a demonic apparition. The children look for Harry the next day, with George denying he knows where he is, despite Billy's suspicions.

Kathy asks the priest Father Callaway (Philip Baker Hall) to bless the house, as a protective measure to prevent any future paranormal incidents, but Father Callaway flees the house when he encounters such occurrences himself. Kathy discovers that the house once belonged to a cult preacher named Reverend Jeremiah Ketcham, whose evil actions towards Native Americans during his "mission" in 17th-century Amityville are said to be the cause of the haunting. Meanwhile, as George is walking through the basement of the house, he encounters the apparitions of the various Native Americans who were tortured and killed there by Ketcham centuries ago. Entering a dimly-lit room, George encounters Ketcham himself (though he is not aware of who he is), and the ghostly figure of the evil missionary turns around, picks up a knife, and slits his throat in an act of recreating his suicide, covering George with blood, and causing him to become nearly completely possessed.

Kathy becomes convinced that George's abusive behavior is owed to a spiritual possession. Following urgent advice from Father Callaway, Kathy tries to evacuate her children from the house and escort them to safety, but the possessed George attempts to kill her and the children; Kathy knocks him out to prevent him from doing so and transports him away from the residence via boat. Subsequently, George is released from the spirit's control and the family permanently leaves the house. A title card states that the family left within 28 days of arriving and never returned. Jodie is shown standing in the now-empty house and screaming in terror while the house rearranges itself back to its original state before the family's arrival. Subsequently, she is pulled beneath the floor by a pair of disembodied hands.

Cast

Production 
Although the film is set on Long Island, it was shot in Chicago, Antioch, Buffalo Grove, and Fox Lake, Illinois, and in Salem and Silver Lake, Wisconsin. The house used is a real 1800s home that was temporarily converted to add the famous quarter moon "eye" windows. The house is in Salem at 27618 Silver Lake Road. The movie facade cost $60,000. After production the movie facade remained on the house for a while and was eventually carefully removed. The famous quarter moon "evil eye" windows were preserved in sections of the walls which still have the movie bedroom wallpaper on the inside and siding with old looking movie paint on the outside. The windows were in good shape but were "aged" to match the house using peeling paint. In 2017 an estate sale was held at the movie mansion and the famous quarter moon "eye" windows, which had been in the attic since filming, were sold. The buyer lives in the same neighborhood and has the windows on display.

MGM claimed the remake was based on new information uncovered during research of the original events, but George Lutz later claimed nobody ever spoke to him or his family about the project. When he initially heard it was underway, his attorney contacted the studio to find out what they had in the planning stages and to express Lutz's belief they didn't have the right to proceed without his input. Three letters were sent and none was acknowledged. In June 2004, the studio filed a motion for declaratory relief in federal court, insisting they had the right to do a remake, and Lutz countersued, citing violations of the original contract that had continued through the years following the release of the first film. The case remained unresolved when Lutz died in May 2006.

Release

Box office 
The Amityville Horror opened on 3,323 screens in the United States on April 15, 2005 and earned $23,507,007 on its opening weekend, ranking first in the domestic box office. It eventually grossed $65,233,369 domestically and $42,813,762 in foreign markets for a total worldwide box office of $108,047,131.

Critical reception 
The film received negative reviews. It holds a 23% score on review aggregator website Rotten Tomatoes, based on 163 reviews, with an average rating of 4.13/10. The site's consensus states: "A so-so remake of a so-so original." Metacritic reports a 33 out of 100 rating, based on 31 critics, indicating "generally unfavorable reviews".

Manohla Dargis of The New York Times said, "Low-key creepy rather than outright scary, the new Amityville marks a modest improvement over the original, partly because, from acting to bloody effects, it is better executed, and partly because the filmmakers have downgraded the role of the priest, played in all his vein-popping glory by Rod Steiger in the first film and by a considerably more subdued Philip Baker Hall here."

Peter Travers of Rolling Stone rated the film one star and commented, "First-time director Andrew Douglas crams in every ghost cliché, from demonic faces to dripping blood. This house springs so many FX shocks it plays like a theme-park ride. Result? It's not scary, just busy. For the real thing, watch Psycho . . . The Shining . . . The Haunting . . . or The Innocents . . . What all those films have in common is precisely what the new Amityville Horror lacks: They know it's what you don't see in a haunted house that fries your nerves to a frazzle."

Ruthe Stein of the San Francisco Chronicle thought "the truly shocking thing about the new version is that it's not bloody awful . . . The decision to use minimal computer-generated effects, made for monetary rather than artistic reasons, works to Amityvilles advantage. It retains the cheesy look of the 1979 original, pure schlock not gussied up to appear to be anything else."

Marjorie Baumgarten of the Austin Chronicle stated the original film was "an effective little tingler whose frights are steady, implied, and cumulative . . . but in the remake the frights are such that you’re wondering why the stubborn Lutzes don’t flee after the first night. Obviously, the filmmakers were keen to remake this film exactly because the technological advances of the last 25 years now permit more graphic displays of horrific imaginings and computer enhancements that can render the invisible world visible. Strategically, the new Amityville never intended to go for the subtler, implied horror of the original; this one would be all about scaring the pants off viewers. And in this, the movie generally succeeds as sudden scares and flashes of yucky imagery cause audience members to yelp aloud as if on cue . . . The most irritating aspect of the new movie, however, has nothing to do with comparisons but rather with some of the inherent illogic of the story. Why are we seeing images of a hanged girl when we know she’s been shot in the head? Images seem to be grafted into the film that have little to do with the actual story. Maybe it’s a technique that succeeds within quick advertising spots, but it piles confusion onto the art of storytelling."

James Christopher of The Times observed, "There is something pleasurably batty about the way the family blunders on. The chills are satisfyingly creepy. The gory special effects are lavish and effective. And the wooden house itself is a sinister architectural pleasure. It’s total nonsense of course, but I left the lights on that night anyway."

The real George Lutz denounced the film as "drivel" and was suing the filmmakers at the time of his death in May 2006.

Home media 
The film was released on DVD and UMD in separate widescreen and fullscreen editions on October 4, 2005. Bonus features include commentary by Reynolds and producers Form and Fuller; eight deleted scenes; On Set Peeks, a seamless branching feature with nine behind-the-scenes vignettes; Supernatural Homicide, with discussions about the murders that are the basis for the film with police and local residents; The Source of Evil, a behind-the-scenes look at the making of the film; and a photo gallery.

A VHS version was released the same day and was the final Dimension film released on VHS. Paramount Home Entertainment (via Miramax) handles the digital distribution rights, including its own logo (though Warner Bros. Home Entertainment handles the home media distribution rights to the film along with the rest of MGM's post-April 1986 library).

References

External links 

 
 
 
 
 

2005 films
2005 horror films
2000s English-language films
2000s ghost films
2000s psychological horror films
2000s supernatural horror films
American ghost films
American haunted house films
American psychological horror films
American supernatural horror films
Amityville Horror films
20th Century Fox films
Metro-Goldwyn-Mayer films
Platinum Dunes films
Miramax films
Dimension Films films
Fiction about familicide
Films about Catholic priests
Films about child abuse
Films about animal cruelty
Films about domestic violence
Films about dysfunctional families
Films about imaginary friends
Films about mass murder
Films about Native Americans
Films about remarriage
Films about spirit possession
Films about widowhood
Films based on American horror novels
Films produced by Andrew Form
Films produced by Bradley Fuller
Films produced by Michael Bay
Films scored by Steve Jablonsky
Films set in 1974
Films set in 1975
Films set in Long Island
Films shot in Chicago
Films shot in Illinois
Films shot in Wisconsin
Horror film remakes
Horror films based on actual events
Religious horror films
Remakes of American films
Torture in films
2000s American films